The city of Ottawa, Canada held municipal elections on January 1, 1923 to elect members of the 1923 Ottawa City Council.

Mayor of Ottawa

Plebiscites

Ottawa Board of Control
(4 elected)

Ottawa City Council
(2 elected from each ward)

References
The Ottawa Evening Citizen, Jan 2, 1923

Municipal elections in Ottawa
1923 elections in Canada
1920s in Ottawa
1923 in Ontario